Sir Roderick Ian Eddington AO FTSE (born 2 January 1950) is an Australian businessman.

He was first appointed to the board of News Corporation in 1999, still serves on News Corp board and also serves on the board of another of Rupert Murdoch's companies, 21st Century Fox, as well as the Herald and Weekly Times in Victoria.

 Eddington is chair of Lion and serves on the board of its Japanese parent company, Kirin. He is also chair of JP Morgan's Asia-Pacific Advisory Council, chair of Infrastructure Partnerships Australia, and a member of the APEC Business Advisory Council.

He has served in other senior positions including as CEO of British Airways.

Education and career

Coming from a country area where there were no high schools, Eddington went to Perth in 1963 to attend Christ Church Grammar School. He studied engineering at the University of Western Australia and graduated with first class honours in 1972. He continued his studies at UWA and completed the degree of Master of Engineering. In 1974, Eddington was the Rhodes Scholar from Western Australia. He completed his DPhil in the Department of Engineering Science at the University of Oxford and played eight first-class cricket matches for Oxford University Cricket Club in 1975 and 1976. He was President of Vincent's Club in 1977.

Eddington joined the Swire Group in 1979, working for its subsidiary Cathay Pacific, before being appointed Managing Director in 1992. Continuing his association with the airline industry; News Limited, subsidiary of News Corporation, appointed Eddington Chairman of Ansett Australia in January 1997, four years before the airline failed. News Corp had taken control of the airline with TNT in 1979. Eddington was appointed Deputy Chairman of News Limited in September 1998. He was further promoted to the News Corporation board in September 1999.

British Airways CEO
Eddington replaced former BA CEO Bob Ayling on 2 May 2000. He removed many aspects of Ayling's corporate relaunch in early 2001: the unpopular ethnic-art tailfins were changed back to the traditional Union Jack tailfin. He steered the company in the aftermath of the 11 September 2001 attacks on New York City and Washington D.C. which proved disastrous for many other airlines.

The decision to permanently retire the British Airways Concorde in 2003 was made by Eddington, and his action remains highly controversial. Eddington stood down as chief executive officer of British Airways on 30 September 2005, after more than five years in the position. He then returned to Australia to take up a position as the head of the Victorian Major Events Association, succeeding Steve Vizard. Eddington was replaced by Willie Walsh in October 2005 after he had followed a six-month shadow position.

Career as a company director

Past
In February 2006, Eddington was a non-executive board member of JPMorgan (Non-Executive Chairman For Australia And New Zealand); News Corporation (non-executive director of publicly-listed Delaware-based company); John Swire & Sons (H.K.) Ltd. (non-executive director); Rio Tinto Group (non-executive director of two publicly-listed companies in the group).

Eddington also served on the board of Allco Finance Group, where he was one of three non-executive directors to approve Allco's ill-fated acquisition of Rubicon Holdings.

Current

As of 2018 he still served on the boards of News Corp and 21st Century Fox. In April 2019 he joined the board of News Corp's Herald and Weekly Times in Victoria.

Eddington was appointed to the board of Lion in March 2011, and appointed chair in March 2012. He joined the parent company's board (Kirin) in March 2020, and holds these positions .

 Eddington was:
chair of JP Morgan's Asia-Pacific Advisory Council;
chair of Infrastructure Partnerships Australia;
a member of the APEC Business Advisory Council; and
President of the Australia Japan Business Cooperation Committee.

Government reports

Transport Study in Britain

On 1 December 2006, Eddington published a UK government-sponsored report into the future of Britain's transport infrastructure.  The Eddington Transport Study set out the case for action to improve road and rail networks, as a "crucial enabler of sustained productivity and competitiveness".  The report's main conclusions were that Britain has transport networks that provide the right connections, in the right places, to support the journeys that matter to economic performance.  But roads in particular were in serious danger of becoming so congested, the economy would suffer.

At the launch of the report Eddington told journalists and transport industry representatives introducing road pricing to encourage drivers to drive less was an "economic no-brainer".  There was, he said "no attractive alternative".  It would cut congestion by half by 2025, and bring benefits to the British economy totalling £28b.

The report also called for a programme of improvements to existing road and rail networks, the expansion of key airports, and adoption of the general principle that travellers should pay for the external costs of the pollution and congestion their journeys cause.

Transport Study in Victoria, Australia

Eddington has since delivered a report to the Victorian Government of Australia, the East West Link Needs Assessment report, which was met with mixed reactions. Economic commentators criticised the cost-benefit ratios of Eddington's proposals, which on Eddington's own analysis were marginal at best.

Honours
Eddington is a Council member of the Royal Institution of Australia.

Eddington received a British knighthood in 2005 for services to the aviation industry.

In 2012 he was appointed an Officer of the Order of Australia (AO) "for distinguished service to business and commerce through roles with a range of national and international economic, trade, infrastructure development and transport organisations", and was also elected a Fellow of the Australian Academy of Technological Sciences and Engineering.

In 2015 he was awarded the Grand Cordon of the Order of the Rising Sun by the Japanese Government for his "contribution to strengthening the economic relations between Australia and Japan".

References

External links
 
 The Eddington Transport Study at the DfT
 Investing in Transport: East West Link Needs Assessment Report to Victorian Government, March 2008. 

1950 births
Living people
People from Perth, Western Australia
University of Western Australia alumni
News Corporation people
Australian businesspeople
Australian cricketers
Australian expatriate cricketers in the United Kingdom
Australian expatriate sportspeople in England
Alumni of Lincoln College, Oxford
Australian Rhodes Scholars
Oxford University cricketers
People educated at Christ Church Grammar School
People educated at Perth Modern School
Australian Knights Bachelor
Businesspeople awarded knighthoods
Officers of the Order of Australia
British Airways people
Cricketers from Western Australia
Fellows of the Australian Academy of Technological Sciences and Engineering
Chief executives in the airline industry